Odds & Sods is an album of studio outtakes by British rock band the Who. It was released by Track Records in the UK and Track/MCA in the US in October 1974. Ten of the recordings on the original eleven-song album were previously unreleased. The album reached No. 10 on the UK charts and No. 15 in the US.

The recordings were compiled by Who bassist John Entwistle. Two LPs of songs were considered in 1974, but only one LP was released at the time. "It could have been a double album, there was that much material," Entwistle said. It was one of the first examples of artists compiling such unreleased recordings. The Who, as well as many other artists, later released similar albums, such as "Who's Missing".

Background
In the autumn of 1973, while Roger Daltrey, Pete Townshend and Keith Moon were preparing for the Tommy film, Entwistle was put in charge of completing an album to counter the rampant bootlegging that arose from the Who's concerts. "If John Entwistle had never seen Who's Zoo," observed that bootleg's cover artist William Stout, "we might not have had the legitimate Who release of Odds & Sods."

"I tried to arrange it like a parallel sort of Who career – what singles we might have released and what album tracks we might have released," Entwistle explained. He and the producer of his solo albums, John Alcock, compiled Odds & Sods from various unreleased Who tapes. 

Townshend wrote liner notes in 1974 that included frank opinions of the quality of the songs. The notes were omitted from some copies of the original LP but included on the 1998 remastered CD. The latter featured material from the unreleased second LP.

Songs
"Postcard", the only song on the original album written by Entwistle, was also released as a single. This track had new overdubs and a remix for the 1974 release. This track as well as "Now I'm a Farmer" and "Naked Eye" had been planned for an EP release in 1970, which was cancelled. 

"Put the Money Down", "Too Much of Anything" and "Pure and Easy" were from the aborted Lifehouse project which the band worked on during 1971 and 1972.

"Little Billy" was written in 1968 by Townshend for the American Cancer Society, but it never saw the light of day because it never left the office of the executive Townshend submitted it to. "Glow Girl" and "Faith in Something Bigger" were also recorded in 1968 for an unfinished studio album. 

"I'm the Face" (which is a reworking of the Slim Harpo classic "Got Love If You Want It") was The Who's first record, when they were still performing as the High Numbers. It was recorded and first released in 1964. Only a few hundred copies of the original single were pressed. The song was remixed in stereo for the 1974 album. 

"Long Live Rock" comes from a 1972 Who recording session. This track was later featured in the Who film "The Kids Are Alright", and released as a single in 1979.

Additional material
The mix of "Under My Thumb" on the 1998 remastered CD is a special stereo remix produced but not used for the Thirty Years of Maximum R&B box set that omits the original fuzzbox guitar part.

The studio version of "Young Man Blues" on the re-issue is not the sampler version of The House that Track Built, but a slower out-take (seemingly due to the tape playing at the wrong speed) from the same sessions as the Sampler Version, which was finally released in an alternate mix on the 2013 deluxe version of Tommy. The iTunes American Store lists this version of "Young Man Blues" as an "Alternate Studio Version" and at the end Kit Lambert is heard to remark: "No, that one didn't really work".

The 2011 reissue featuring the original analog mixes has some different takes than the 1998 version. For example, "Young Man Blues" is a different take than the 1998 remix.

Release history
On 29 August 2020, the album was re-released as a limited edition coloured double vinyl LP. The first disc consists of the 1974 release. The second consists of various tracks, many of which were included in the expanded 1998 CD reissue, some of which were included on other releases, and others available for the first time on the 2020 release.

Track listing
All songs written by Pete Townshend except where noted.

Original album

1998 remaster

CD Reissue 2011 (SHM-CD) 
In December 2011, Universal Japan issued the original analogue mix for the album on CD with the songs reflecting the order of the original vinyl. The bonus tracks that were issued previously on the 1998 CD remix reissue were added after the original running order of the album. These bonus tracks used the original analogue mixes where possible rather than the remixes prepared for the 1998 expanded CD reissue. The reissue was remastered by Jon Astley.

2020 RSD edition

Personnel
The Who
Roger Daltrey – lead vocals, backing vocals, harmonica
Pete Townshend – guitar, piano, synthesizer, backing and lead vocals
John Entwistle – bass, brass, backing and lead vocals
Keith Moon – drums, occasional vocals

Production
John Entwistle – album compilation
John Alcock – album compilation
Peter Meaden – production
Chris Parmeinter – production
Kit Lambert – production
Glyn Johns – associate production
Roger Daltrey – sleeve concept
Graham Hughes – album cover design, photography, design concept
Pete Townshend – liner notes
 Jon Astley  – 1998 reissue producer
Chris Charlesworth – executive producer, 1998 reissue
Bill Curbishley – executive producer, 1998 reissue
Robert Rosenberg – executive producer, 1998 reissue
Richard Evans – design & art direction, 1998 reissue
Andy MacPherson – mixing, 1998 reissue

Charts

Certifications

References

External links
Odds & Sods liner notes – Song-by-song liner notes for the album
Kid Dynamite – Cheap Shots, Youth Anthems; Odds and Sods Cover

The Who compilation albums
1974 compilation albums
Albums produced by Glyn Johns
Albums produced by Shel Talmy
Albums produced by Kit Lambert
MCA Records compilation albums
Polydor Records compilation albums
Track Records compilation albums